A list of films produced in France in 1921:

See also
 1921 in France

References

External links
 French films of 1921 at the Internet Movie Database
French films of 1921 at Cinema-francais.fr

1921
Lists of 1921 films by country or language
Films